Lev Davidovich Bronstein ( – 21 August 1940), better known as Leon Trotsky, was a Russian revolutionary, political theorist and Soviet politician. Ideologically a Marxist, his developments to the ideology are called Trotskyism.

Born to a wealthy Jewish family in Yanovka (now Bereslavka, Ukraine), Trotsky embraced Marxism after moving to Nikolayev in 1896. In 1898, he was arrested for revolutionary activities and subsequently exiled to Siberia. He escaped from Siberia in 1902 and moved to London, where he befriended Vladimir Lenin. In 1903, he sided with Julius Martov's Mensheviks against Lenin's Bolsheviks during the Russian Social Democratic Labour Party's initial organisational split. Trotsky helped organize the failed Russian Revolution of 1905, after which he was again arrested and exiled to Siberia. He once again escaped, and spent the following 10 years working in Britain, Austria, Switzerland, France, Spain, and the United States. After the 1917 February Revolution brought an end to the Tsarist monarchy, Trotsky returned from New York via Canada to Russia and became a leader in the Bolshevik faction. As chairman of the Petrograd Soviet, he played a key role in the October Revolution of November 1917 that overthrew the new Provisional Government.

Once in government, Trotsky initially held the post of Commissar for Foreign Affairs and became directly involved in the 1917–1918 Brest-Litovsk negotiations with Germany as Russia pulled out of the First World War. From March 1918 to January 1925, Trotsky headed the Red Army as People's Commissar for Military and Naval Affairs and played a vital role in the Bolshevik victory in the Russian Civil War of 1917–1922. He became one of the seven members of the first Bolshevik Politburo in 1919.

After the death of Lenin in January 1924 and the rise of Joseph Stalin, Trotsky gradually lost his government positions; the Politburo eventually expelled him from the Soviet Union in February 1929. Trotsky also led the Left Opposition from 1923-27 and advocated a programme of mass industrialisation with an extension of worker's democracy which preceded the establishment of the First Five-Year Plan in the Soviet Union.

He spent the rest of his life in exile, writing prolifically and engaging in open critique of Stalinism. In 1938 Trotsky and his supporters founded the Fourth International in opposition to Stalin's Comintern. After surviving multiple attempts on his life, Trotsky was assassinated in August 1940 in Mexico City by Ramón Mercader, an agent of the Soviet NKVD. Written out of Soviet history books under Stalin, Trotsky was one of the few rivals of Stalin to not be rehabilitated by either Nikita Khrushchev or Mikhail Gorbachev. Trotsky's rehabilitation came in 2001 by the Russian Federation.

Childhood and family (1879–1895) 

Leon Trotsky was born Lev Davidovich Bronstein to David Leontyevich Bronstein (1847–1922) and Anna Lvovna (née Zhivotovskaya, 1850–1910) on 7 November 1879, the fifth child of a wealthy Jewish landowner family in Yanovka, Kherson governorate, Russian Empire (now Bereslavka, Ukraine). His father, David Leontyevich, had lived in Poltava, and later moved to Bereslavka, as it had a large Jewish community. Trotsky's younger sister, Olga, who also grew up to be a Bolshevik and a Soviet politician, married the prominent Bolshevik Lev Kamenev.

Some authors, notably Robert Service, have claimed that Trotsky's childhood first name was the Yiddish Leiba. The American Trotskyist David North said that this was an assumption based on Trotsky's Jewish birth, but, contrary to Service's claims, there is no documentary evidence to support his using a Yiddish name, when that language was not spoken by his family. Both North and political historian Walter Laqueur wrote that Trotsky's childhood name was Lyova, a standard Russian diminutive of the name Lev. North has compared the speculation on Trotsky's given name to the undue emphasis given to his having a Jewish surname.

The language spoken at home was not Yiddish but a mixture of Russian and Ukrainian (known as Surzhyk).

When Trotsky was eight, his father sent him to Odessa to be educated. He was enrolled in a Lutheran German-language school (Realschule zum Heiligen Paulus or school of the Lutheran St. Pauls Cathedral, a school of Black Sea Germans which also admitted students of other faiths and backgrounds), which became Russified during his years in Odessa as a result of the Imperial government's policy of Russification. Trotsky and his wife Natalia later registered their children as Lutheran, since Austrian law at the time required children to be given religious education "in the faith of their parents". As Isaac Deutscher notes in his biography of Trotsky, Odessa was then a bustling cosmopolitan port city, very unlike the typical Russian city of the time. This environment contributed to the development of the young man's international outlook.

Although Trotsky spoke French, English, and German to a good standard, he said in his autobiography My Life that he was never perfectly fluent in any language but Russian. Raymond Molinier wrote that Trotsky spoke French fluently.

Early political activities and life (1896–1917)

Revolutionary activity and imprisonment (1896–1898) 

Trotsky became involved in revolutionary activities in 1896 after moving to the harbor town of Nikolayev on the Ukrainian coast of the Black Sea. At first a narodnik (revolutionary agrarian socialist populist), he initially opposed Marxism but was won over to Marxism later that year by his future first wife, Aleksandra Sokolovskaya. Instead of pursuing a mathematics degree, Trotsky helped organize the South Russian Workers' Union in Nikolayev in early 1897. Using the name "Lvov", he wrote and printed leaflets and proclamations, distributed revolutionary pamphlets, and popularized socialist ideas among industrial workers and revolutionary students.

In January 1898, more than 200 members of the union, including Trotsky, were arrested. He was held for the next two years in prison awaiting trial, first in Nikolayev, then Kherson, then Odessa, and finally in Moscow. In the Moscow prison, he came into contact with other revolutionaries, heard about Lenin and read Lenin's book, The Development of Capitalism in Russia. Two months into his imprisonment, on 1–3 March 1898, the first Congress of the newly formed Russian Social Democratic Labor Party (RSDLP) was held. From then on Trotsky identified as a member of the party.

First marriage and Siberian exile (1899–1902) 

While in the prison in Moscow, in the summer of 1899, Trotsky married Aleksandra Sokolovskaya (1872–1938), a fellow Marxist. The wedding ceremony was performed by a Jewish chaplain.

In 1900, he was sentenced to four years in exile in Siberia. Because of their marriage, Trotsky and his wife were allowed to be exiled to the same location in Siberia. They were exiled to Ust-Kut and the Verkholensk in the Baikal Lake region of Siberia. They had two daughters, Zinaida (1901–1933) and Nina (1902–1928), both born in Siberia.

In Siberia, Trotsky studied philosophy. He became aware of the differences within the party, which had been decimated by arrests in 1898 and 1899. Some social democrats known as "economists" argued that the party should focus on helping industrial workers improve their lot in life and were not so worried about changing the government. They believed that societal reforms would grow out of the worker's struggle for higher pay and better working conditions. Others argued that overthrowing the monarchy was more important and that a well-organized and disciplined revolutionary party was essential. The latter position was expressed by the London-based newspaper Iskra (The Spark), which was founded in 1900. Trotsky quickly sided with the Iskra position and began writing for the paper.

In the summer of 1902, at the urging of his wife, Aleksandra, Trotsky escaped from Siberia hidden in a load of hay on a wagon. Aleksandra later escaped from Siberia with their daughters. Both daughters married, and Zinaida had children, but the daughters died before their parents. Nina Nevelson died from tuberculosis in 1928, cared for in her last months by her older sister. Zinaida Volkova followed her father into exile in Berlin, taking her son by her second marriage but leaving behind a daughter in Russia. Suffering also from tuberculosis and depression, Zinaida committed suicide in 1933. Aleksandra disappeared in 1935 during the Great Purges in the Soviet Union under Stalin and was murdered by Stalinist forces three years later.

First emigration and  second marriage (1902–1903) 

Until this point in his life, Trotsky had used his birth name: Lev (Leon) Bronstein. He changed his surname to "Trotsky", the name he would use for the rest of his life. It is said he adopted the name of a jailer of the Odessa prison in which he had earlier been held. This became his primary revolutionary pseudonym. After his escape from Siberia, Trotsky moved to London, joining Georgi Plekhanov, Vladimir Lenin, Julius Martov and other editors of Iskra. Under the pen name Pero ("feather" or "pen"), Trotsky soon became one of the paper's leading writers.

Unknown to Trotsky, the six editors of Iskra were evenly split between the "old guard" led by Plekhanov and the "new guard" led by Lenin and Martov. Plekhanov's supporters were older (in their 40s and 50s), and had spent the previous 20 years together in exile in Europe. Members of the new guard were in their early 30s and had only recently emigrated from Russia. Lenin, who was trying to establish a permanent majority against Plekhanov within Iskra, expected Trotsky, then 23, to side with the new guard. In March 1903 Lenin wrote:

Because of Plekhanov's opposition, Trotsky did not become a full member of the board. But from then on, he participated in its meetings in an advisory capacity, which earned him Plekhanov's enmity.

In late 1902, Trotsky met Natalia Sedova (1882–1962), who soon became his companion. They married in 1903, and she was with him until his death. They had two children together, Lev Sedov (1906–1938) and Sergei Sedov (1908–1937), both of whom would predecease their parents. Regarding his sons' surnames, Trotsky later explained that after the 1917 revolution:

Trotsky never used the name "Sedov" either privately or publicly. Natalia Sedova sometimes signed her name "Sedova-Trotskaya".

Split with Lenin (1903–1904) 

In the meantime, after a period of secret police repression and internal confusion that followed the First Congress of the Russian Social Democratic Labour Party in 1898, Iskra succeeded in convening the party's Second Congress in London in August 1903. Trotsky and other Iskra editors attended. The first congress went as planned, with Iskra supporters handily defeating the few "economist" delegates. Then the congress discussed the position of the Jewish Bund, which had co-founded the RSDLP in 1898 but wanted to remain autonomous within the party.

Shortly after that, the pro-Iskra delegates unexpectedly split into two factions. The split was initially over an organisational issue. Lenin and his supporters, the Bolsheviks, argued for a smaller but highly organized party where only party members would be seen as members, while Martov and his supporters, the Mensheviks, argued for a bigger and less disciplined party where people who assisted the party would also be seen as members. In a surprise development, Trotsky and most of the Iskra editors supported Martov and the Mensheviks, while Plekhanov supported Lenin and the Bolsheviks. During 1903 and 1904, many members changed sides in the factions. Plekhanov soon parted ways with the Bolsheviks. Trotsky left the Mensheviks in September 1904 over their insistence on an alliance with Russian liberals and their opposition to a reconciliation with Lenin and the Bolsheviks.

From 1904 until 1917, Trotsky described himself as a "non-factional social democrat". He worked between 1904 and 1917, trying to reconcile different groups within the party, which resulted in many clashes with Lenin and other prominent party members. Trotsky later maintained that he had been wrong in opposing Lenin on the issue of the party. During these years, Trotsky began developing his theory of permanent revolution and developed a close working relationship with Alexander Parvus in 1904–07.

During their split, Lenin referred to Trotsky as "Little Judas" (Iudushka, based on the character from Mikhail Saltykov-Shchedrin's novel The Golovlyov Family), a "scoundrel" and a "swine".

1905 revolution and trial (1905–1906) 
The unrest and agitation against the Russian government came to a head in Saint Petersburg on 3 January 1905 (Julian Calendar), when a strike broke out at the Putilov Works in the city. This single strike grew into a general strike, and by 7 January 1905, there were 140,000 strikers in Saint Petersburg.

On Sunday, 9 January 1905, Father Georgi Gapon knowingly led a procession of radicals mixed within larger groups of ordinary working citizens through the streets to the Winter Palace to supposedly beseech the Tsar for food and relief from the government. According to Gapon himself, he led the people into a Palace Guard already on the defensive due to the crowd instigating violence against them. They eventually fired on the demonstration, resulting in the deaths of an unknown number of violent radicals, peaceful demonstrators and police caught within the melee. Although Sunday, 9 January 1905, became known as Bloody Sunday, Gapon's own biography points to a conspiracy. This was later confirmed by Russian police records listing the number of known militant radicals found among the dead.   

Following the events of Bloody Sunday, Trotsky secretly returned to Russia in February 1905, by way of Kyiv. At first he wrote leaflets for an underground printing press in Kyiv, but soon moved to the capital, Saint Petersburg. There he worked with both Bolsheviks, such as Central Committee member Leonid Krasin, and the local Menshevik committee, which he pushed in a more radical direction. The latter, however, were betrayed by a secret police agent in May, and Trotsky had to flee to rural Finland. There he worked on fleshing out his theory of permanent revolution.

On 19 September 1905, the typesetters at the Ivan Sytin's printing house in Moscow went out on strike for shorter hours and higher pay. By the evening of 24 September, the workers at 50 other printing shops in Moscow were also on strike. On 2 October 1905, the typesetters in printing shops in Saint Petersburg decided to strike in support of the Moscow strikers. On 7 October 1905, the railway workers of the Moscow–Kazan Railway went out on strike. Amid the resulting confusion, Trotsky returned from Finland to Saint Petersburg on 15 October 1905. On that day, Trotsky spoke before the Saint Petersburg Soviet Council of Workers Deputies, which was meeting at the Technological Institute in the city. Also attending were some 200,000 people crowded outside to hear the speeches—about half of all workers in Saint Petersburg.

After his return, Trotsky and Parvus took over the newspaper Russian Gazette, increasing its circulation to 500,000. Trotsky also co-founded, together with Parvus and Julius Martov and other Mensheviks, "Nachalo" ("The Beginning"), which also proved to be a very successful newspaper in the revolutionary atmosphere of Saint Petersburg in 1905.

Just before Trotsky's return, the Mensheviks had independently come up with the same idea that Trotsky had: an elected non-party revolutionary organization representing the capital's workers, the first Soviet ("Council") of Workers. By the time of Trotsky's arrival, the Saint Petersburg Soviet was already functioning, headed by Khrustalyev-Nosar (Georgy Nosar, alias Pyotr Khrustalyov). Khrustalyev-Nosar had been a compromise figure when elected as the head of the Saint Petersburg Soviet. He was a lawyer that stood above the political factions contained in the Soviet.

However, since his election, he proved to be very popular with the workers in spite of the Bolsheviks' original opposition to him. Khrustalev-Nosar became famous in his position as spokesman for the Saint Petersburg Soviet. Indeed, to the outside world, Khrustalev-Nosar was the embodiment of the Saint Petersburg Soviet. Trotsky joined the Soviet under the name "Yanovsky" (after the village he was born in, Yanovka) and was elected vice-chairman. He did much of the actual work at the Soviet and, after Khrustalev-Nosar's arrest on 26 November 1905, was elected its chairman. On 2 December, the Soviet issued a proclamation which included the following statement about the Tsarist government and its foreign debts: 

The following day, on 3 December 1905, the Soviet was surrounded by troops loyal to the government and the deputies were arrested. Trotsky and other Soviet leaders were tried in 1906 on charges of supporting an armed rebellion. On 4 October 1906 he was convicted and sentenced to internal exile to Siberia.

Second emigration (1907–1914) 

While en route to exile in Obdorsk, Siberia, in January 1907, Trotsky escaped at Berezov and once again made his way to London. He attended the 5th Congress of the RSDLP. In October, he moved to Vienna, Austria-Hungary. For the next seven years, he often took part in the activities of the Austrian Social Democratic Party and, occasionally, of the German Social Democratic Party.

In Vienna, Trotsky became close to Adolph Joffe, his friend for the next 20 years, who introduced him to psychoanalysis.

In October 1908 he was asked to join the editorial staff of Pravda ("Truth"), a bi-weekly, Russian-language social democratic paper for Russian workers, which he co-edited with Adolph Joffe and Matvey Skobelev. It was smuggled into Russia. The paper appeared very irregularly; only five issues were published in its first year.

Avoiding factional politics, the paper proved popular with Russian industrial workers. Both the Bolsheviks and the Mensheviks split multiple times after the failure of the 1905–1907 revolution. Money was very scarce for the publication of Pravda. Trotsky approached the Russian Central Committee to seek financial backing for the newspaper throughout 1909.

A majority of Bolsheviks controlled the Central Committee in 1910. Lenin agreed to the financing of "Pravda", but required a Bolshevik to be appointed as co-editor of the paper. When various Bolshevik and Menshevik factions tried to re-unite at the January 1910 RSDLP Central Committee meeting in Paris over Lenin's objections, Trotsky's Pravda was made a party-financed 'central organ'. Lev Kamenev, Trotsky's brother-in-law, was added to the editorial board from the Bolsheviks, but the unification attempts failed in August 1910. Kamenev resigned from the board amid mutual recriminations. Trotsky continued publishing Pravda for another two years until it finally folded in April 1912.

The Bolsheviks started a new workers-oriented newspaper in Saint Petersburg on 22 April 1912 and also called it Pravda. Trotsky was so upset by what he saw as a usurpation of his newspaper's name that in April 1913, he wrote a letter to Nikolay Chkheidze, a Menshevik leader, bitterly denouncing Lenin and the Bolsheviks. Though he quickly got over the disagreement, the message was intercepted by the Russian police, and a copy was put into their archives. Shortly after Lenin's death in 1924, the letter was found and publicized by Trotsky's opponents within the Communist Party to portray him as Lenin's enemy.

The 1910s were a period of heightened tension within the RSDLP, leading to numerous frictions between Trotsky, the Bolsheviks and the Mensheviks. The most serious disagreement that Trotsky and the Mensheviks had with Lenin at the time was over the issue of "expropriations", i.e., armed robbery of banks and other companies by Bolshevik groups to procure money for the Party. These actions had been banned by the 5th Congress, but were continued by the Bolsheviks.

In January 1912, the majority of the Bolshevik faction, led by Lenin, as well as a few defecting Mensheviks, held a conference in Prague and decided to break away from the Russian Social Democratic Labour Party, and formed a new party, the Russian Social Democratic Labour Party (Bolsheviks). In response, Trotsky organized a "unification" conference of social democratic factions in Vienna in August 1912 (a.k.a. "The August Bloc") and tried to re-unite the Bolsheviks and Mensheviks into one party. The attempt was generally unsuccessful.

In Vienna, Trotsky continuously published articles in radical Russian and Ukrainian newspapers, such as Kievskaya Mysl, under a variety of pseudonyms, often using "Antid Oto". In September 1912, Kievskaya Mysl sent him to the Balkans as its war correspondent, where he covered the two Balkan Wars for the next year. While there, Trotsky chronicled the ethnic cleansing carried out by the Serbian army against the Albanian civilian population. He became a close friend of Christian Rakovsky, later a leading Soviet politician and Trotsky's ally in the Soviet Communist Party. On 3 August 1914, at the outbreak of World War I, in which Austria-Hungary fought against the Russian Empire, Trotsky was forced to flee Vienna for neutral Switzerland to avoid arrest as a Russian émigré.

World War I (1914–1917) 
The outbreak of World War I caused a sudden realignment within the RSDLP and other European social democratic parties over the issues of war, revolution, pacifism and internationalism, redividing the party into defeatists and defencists. Within the RSDLP, Lenin, Trotsky and Martov advocated various internationalist anti-war positions that saw defeat for your own country's ruling class imperialists as the "lesser evil" in the war, while they opposed all imperialists in the imperialist war. These anti-war believers were known as "defeatists". Those who supported one side over the other in the war were known as "defencists". Plekhanov and many other defencist social democrats (both Bolsheviks and Mensheviks) supported the Russian government to some extent and wanted them to win the war, while Trotsky's ex-colleague Parvus, now a defencist, sided against Russia so strongly that he wanted Germany to win the war. In Switzerland, Trotsky briefly worked within the Swiss Socialist Party, prompting it to adopt an internationalist resolution. He wrote a book opposing the war, The War and the International, and the pro-war position taken by the European social democratic parties, primarily the German party.

As a war correspondent for the Kievskaya Mysl, Trotsky moved to France on 19 November 1914. In January 1915 in Paris, he began editing (at first with Martov, who soon resigned as the paper moved to the left) Nashe Slovo ("Our Word"), an internationalist socialist newspaper. He adopted the slogan of "peace without indemnities or annexations, peace without conquerors or conquered." Lenin advocated Russia's defeat in the war and demanded a complete break with the Second International.

Trotsky attended the Zimmerwald Conference of anti-war socialists in September 1915 and advocated a middle course between those who, like Martov, would stay within the Second International at any cost and those who, like Lenin, would break with the Second International and form a Third International. The conference adopted the middle line proposed by Trotsky. At first opposed, in the end Lenin voted for Trotsky's resolution to avoid a split among anti-war socialists.

In September 1916, Trotsky was deported from France to Spain for his anti-war activities. Spanish authorities did not want him and deported him to the United States on 25 December 1916. He arrived in New York City on 13 January 1917. He stayed for nearly three months at 1522 Vyse Avenue in The Bronx. In New York he wrote articles for the local Russian language socialist newspaper, Novy Mir, and the Yiddish-language daily, Der Forverts (The Jewish Daily Forward), in translation. He also made speeches to Russian émigrés.

Trotsky was living in New York City when the February Revolution of 1917 overthrew Tsar Nicholas II. He left New York on 27 March 1917, but his ship, the SS Kristianiafjord, was intercepted by British naval officials in Canada at Halifax, Nova Scotia. He was detained for a month at Amherst Internment Camp in Nova Scotia. While imprisoned in the camp, Trotsky established an increasing friendship with the workers and sailors amongst his fellow inmates, describing his month at the camp as "one continual mass meeting".

Trotsky's speeches and agitation incurred the wrath of German officer inmates who complained to the British camp commander, Colonel Morris, about Trotsky's "anti-patriotic" attitude. Morris then forbade Trotsky to make any more public speeches, leading to 530 prisoners protesting and signing a petition against Morris' order. Back in Russia, after initial hesitation and facing pressure from the workers' and peasants' Soviets, the Russian foreign minister Pavel Milyukov was compelled to demand the release of Trotsky as a Russian citizen, and the British government freed him on 29 April 1917.

He reached Russia on 17 May 1917. After his return, Trotsky substantially agreed with the Bolshevik position, but did not join them right away. Russian social democrats were split into at least six groups, and the Bolsheviks were waiting for the next party Congress to determine which factions to merge with. Trotsky temporarily joined the Mezhraiontsy, a regional social democratic organization in Saint Petersburg, and became one of its leaders. At the First Congress of Soviets in June, he was elected a member of the first All-Russian Central Executive Committee ("VTsIK") from the Mezhraiontsy faction.

After an unsuccessful pro-Bolshevik uprising in Saint Petersburg, Trotsky was arrested on 7 August 1917. He was released 40 days later in the aftermath of the failed counter-revolutionary uprising by Lavr Kornilov. He sided with Lenin against Grigory Zinoviev and Lev Kamenev when the Bolshevik Central Committee discussed staging an armed uprising, and he led the efforts to overthrow the Provisional Government headed by Aleksandr Kerensky.

The following summary of Trotsky's role in 1917 was written by Stalin in Pravda, 6 November 1918. Although this passage was quoted in Stalin's book The October Revolution (1934), it was expunged from Stalin's Works (1949).

After the success of the uprising on 7–8 November 1917, Trotsky led the efforts to repel a counter-attack by Cossacks under General Pyotr Krasnov and other troops still loyal to the overthrown Provisional Government at Gatchina. Allied with Lenin, he defeated attempts by other Bolshevik Central Committee members (Zinoviev, Kamenev, Rykov, etc.) to share power with other socialist parties. By the end of 1917, Trotsky was unquestionably the second man in the Bolshevik Party after Lenin. He overshadowed the ambitious Zinoviev, who had been Lenin's top lieutenant over the previous decade, but whose star appeared to be fading. This reversal of position contributed to continuing competition and enmity between the two men, which lasted until 1926 and did much to destroy them both.

On 23 November 1917, Trotsky revealed the secret treaty arrangements which had been made between the Tsarist government, Britain and France, causing them considerable embarrassment.

Russian Revolution and aftermath

Commissar for Foreign Affairs and Brest-Litovsk (1917–1918) 

After the Bolsheviks came to power, Trotsky became the People's Commissar for Foreign Affairs and published the secret treaties previously signed by the Triple Entente that detailed plans for post-war reallocation of colonies and redrawing state borders.

In preparation for peace talks with the representatives of the German government and the representatives of the other Central Powers leading up to the Treaty of Brest-Litovsk, Leon Trotsky appointed his old friend Joffe to represent the Bolsheviks. When the Soviet delegation learned that Germans and Austro-Hungarians planned to annex slices of Polish territory and to set up a rump Polish state with what remained, while the Baltic provinces were to become client states ruled by German princes, the talks were recessed for 12 days. The Soviets' only hopes were that, given time, their allies would agree to join the negotiations or that the western European proletariat would revolt, so their best strategy was to prolong the negotiations. As Foreign Minister Leon Trotsky wrote, "To delay negotiations, there must be someone to do the delaying". Therefore, Trotsky replaced Joffe as the leader of the Soviet delegation during the peace negotiations in Brest-Litovsk from 22 December 1917 to 10 February 1918. At that time the Soviet government was split on the issue. Left Communists, led by Nikolai Bukharin, continued to believe that there could be no peace between a Soviet republic and a capitalist country, and that only a revolutionary war leading to a pan-European Soviet republic would bring a durable peace.

They cited the successes of the newly formed (15 January 1918) voluntary Red Army against Polish forces of Gen. Józef Dowbor-Muśnicki in Belarus, White forces in the Don region, and newly independent Ukrainian forces as proof that the Red Army could repel German forces, especially if propaganda and asymmetrical warfare were used.

They were willing to hold talks with the Germans as a means of exposing German imperial ambitions (territorial gains, reparations, etc.) in the hope of accelerating the hoped−for Soviet revolution in the West. Still, they were dead set against signing any peace treaty. In the case of a German ultimatum, they advocated proclaiming a revolutionary war against Germany to inspire Russian and European workers to fight for socialism. This opinion was shared by Left Socialist Revolutionaries, who were then the Bolsheviks' junior partners in a coalition government.

Lenin, who had earlier hoped for a speedy Soviet revolution in Germany and other parts of Europe, quickly decided that the imperial government of Germany was still firmly in control and that, without a strong Russian military, an armed conflict with Germany would lead to a collapse of the Soviet government in Russia. He agreed with the Left Communists that ultimately a pan-European Soviet revolution would solve all problems, but until then the Bolsheviks had to stay in power. Lenin did not mind prolonging the negotiating process for maximum propaganda effect, but, from January 1918 on, advocated signing a separate peace treaty if faced with a German ultimatum. Trotsky's position was between these two Bolshevik factions. Like Lenin, he admitted that the old Russian military, inherited from the monarchy and the Provisional Government and in advanced stages of decomposition, was unable to fight:

But he agreed with the Left Communists that a separate peace treaty with an imperialist power would be a terrible morale and material blow to the Soviet government, negate all its military and political successes of 1917 and 1918, resurrect the notion that the Bolsheviks secretly allied with the German government, and cause an upsurge of internal resistance. He argued that any German ultimatum should be refused, and that this might well lead to an uprising in Germany, or at least inspire German soldiers to disobey their officers since any German offensive would be a naked grab for territories. Trotsky wrote in 1925:

Germany resumed military operations on 18 February. Within a day, it became clear that the German army was capable of conducting offensive operations and that Red Army detachments, which were relatively small, poorly organized and poorly led, were no match for it. On the evening of 18 February 1918, Trotsky and his supporters in the committee abstained, and Lenin's proposal was accepted 7–4. The Soviet government sent a radiogram to the German side, taking the final Brest-Litovsk peace terms.

Germany did not respond for three days and continued its offensive, encountering little resistance. The response arrived on 21 February, but the proposed terms were so harsh that even Lenin briefly thought that the Soviet government had no choice but to fight. But in the end, the committee again voted 7–4 on 23 February 1918; the Treaty of Brest-Litovsk was signed on 3 March and ratified on 15 March 1918. Since Trotsky was so closely associated with the policy previously followed by the Soviet delegation at Brest-Litovsk, he resigned from his position as Commissar for Foreign Affairs to remove a potential obstacle to the new policy.

Head of the Red Army (spring 1918) 

The entire Bolshevik leadership of the Red Army, including People's Commissar (defence minister) Nikolai Podvoisky and commander-in-chief Nikolai Krylenko, protested vigorously and eventually resigned. They believed that the Red Army should consist only of dedicated revolutionaries, rely on propaganda and force, and have elected officers. They viewed former imperial officers and generals as potential traitors who should be kept out of the new military, much less put in charge of it. Their views continued to be popular with many Bolsheviks throughout most of the Russian Civil War, and their supporters, including Podvoisky, who became one of Trotsky's deputies, were a constant thorn in Trotsky's side. The discontent with Trotsky's policies of strict discipline, conscription and reliance on carefully supervised non-Communist military experts eventually led to the Military Opposition, which was active within the Communist Party in late 1918–1919.

On 13 March 1918, Trotsky's resignation as Commissar for Foreign Affairs was officially accepted, and he was appointed People's Commissar of Army and Navy Affairs—in place of Podvoisky—and chairman of the Supreme Military Council. The post of commander-in-chief was abolished, and Trotsky gained full control of the Red Army, responsible only to the Communist Party leadership, whose Left Socialist Revolutionary allies had left the government over Brest-Litovsk.

Civil War (1918–1920)

1918 

The military situation soon tested Trotsky's managerial and organization-building skills. In May–June 1918, the Czechoslovak Legions en route from European Russia to Vladivostok rose against the Soviet government. This left the Bolsheviks with the loss of most of the country's territory, an increasingly well-organized resistance by Russian anti-Communist forces (usually referred to as the White Army after their best-known component) and widespread defection by the military experts whom Trotsky relied on.

Trotsky and the government responded with a full-fledged mobilisation, which increased the size of the Red Army from fewer than 300,000 in May 1918 to one million in October, and an introduction of political commissars into the army. The latter had the task of ensuring the loyalty of military experts (mostly former officers in the imperial army) and co-signing their orders. Trotsky regarded the organisation of the Red Army as built on the ideas of the October Revolution. As he later wrote in his autobiography:

In response to Socialist-Revolutionary Fanya Kaplan's attempted assassination of Lenin on 30 August 1918, and to the successful assassination of the Petrograd Soviet secret police chief Moisei Uritsky on 17 August 1918, the Bolsheviks instructed Felix Dzerzhinsky to commence a Red Terror, announced in the 1 September 1918 issue of the Krasnaya Gazeta (Red Gazette). Regarding the Red Terror Trotsky wrote:

In dealing with deserters, Trotsky often appealed to them politically, arousing them with the ideas of the Revolution.

The first use of the punitive barrier troops by the Red Army occurred in the late summer and fall of 1918 in the Eastern front during the Russian Civil War, when People's Commissar of Military and Naval Affairs (War Commissar) Leon Trotsky of the Communist Bolshevik government authorized Mikhail Tukhachevsky, the commander of the 1st Army, to station blocking detachments behind unreliable Red Army infantry regiments in the 1st Red Army, with orders to shoot if front-line troops either deserted or retreated without permission. The barrier troops comprised personnel drawn from Cheka punitive detachments or from regular Red Army infantry regiments.

In December 1918 Trotsky ordered that detachments of additional barrier troops be raised for attachment to each infantry formation in the Red Army. On December 18 he cabled: How do things stand with the blocking units? As far as I am aware they have not been included in our establishment and it appears they have no personnel. It is absolutely essential that we have at least an embryonic network of blocking units and that we work out a procedure for bringing them up to strength and deploying them. The barrier troops were also used to enforce Bolshevik control over food supplies in areas controlled by the Red Army, a role which soon earned them the hatred of the Russian civilian population.

Given the lack of manpower and the 16 opposing foreign armies, Trotsky also insisted on the use of former Tsarist officers as military specialists within the Red Army, in combination with Bolshevik political commissars to ensure the revolutionary nature of the Red Army. Lenin commented on this:

In September 1918, the Bolshevik government, facing continuous military difficulties, declared what amounted to martial law and reorganized the Red Army. The Supreme Military Council was abolished, and the position of commander-in-chief was restored, filled by the commander of the Latvian Riflemen, Loakim Vatsetis (a.k.a. Jukums Vācietis), who had formerly led the Eastern Front against the Czechoslovak Legions. Vatsetis took charge of the day-to-day operations of the army. At the same time, Trotsky became chairman of the newly formed Revolutionary Military Council of the Republic and retained overall control of the military. Trotsky and Vatsetis had clashed earlier in 1918, while Vatsetis and Trotsky's adviser Mikhail Bonch-Bruevich were also on unfriendly terms. Nevertheless, Trotsky eventually established a working relationship with the often prickly Vatsetis.

The reorganization caused yet another conflict, this time between Trotsky and Stalin, in late September. Trotsky appointed former imperial general Pavel Pavlovich Sytin to command the Southern Front, but in early October 1918 Stalin refused to accept him and so he was recalled from the front. Lenin and Yakov Sverdlov tried to make Trotsky and Stalin reconcile, but their meeting proved unsuccessful.

1919 

Throughout late 1918 and early 1919, there were a number of attacks on Trotsky's leadership of the Red Army, including veiled accusations in newspaper articles inspired by Stalin and a direct attack by the Military Opposition at the VIIIth Party Congress in March 1919. On the surface, he weathered them successfully and was elected one of only five full members of the first Politburo after the Congress. But he later wrote:

In mid-1919, the dissatisfied had an opportunity to mount a serious challenge to Trotsky's leadership: the Red Army grew from 800,000 to 3,000,000 and fought simultaneously on sixteen fronts.

At the 3–4 July Central Committee meeting, after a heated exchange, the majority supported Kamenev and Smilga against Vācietis and Trotsky. Trotsky's plan was rejected, and he was much criticized for various alleged shortcomings in his leadership style, much of it of a personal nature. Stalin used this opportunity to pressure Lenin to dismiss Trotsky from his post.

However, some significant changes to the leadership of the Red Army were made. Trotsky was temporarily sent to the Southern Front, while Smilga informally coordinated the work in Moscow. Most members of the Revolutionary Military Council who were not involved in its day-to-day operations were relieved of their duties on 8 July, and new members, including Smilga, were added. The same day, while Trotsky was in the south, Vācietis was suddenly arrested by the Cheka on suspicion of involvement in an anti-Soviet plot, and replaced by Sergey Kamenev. After a few weeks in the south, Trotsky returned to Moscow and resumed control of the Red Army. A year later, Smilga and Tukhachevsky were defeated during the Battle of Warsaw, but Trotsky refused this opportunity to pay Smilga back, which earned him Smilga's friendship and later his support during the intra-Party battles of the 1920s.

By October 1919, the government was in the worst crisis of the Civil War: Denikin's troops approached Tula and Moscow from the south, and General Nikolay Yudenich's troops approached Petrograd from the west. Lenin decided that since it was more important to defend Moscow, Petrograd would have to be abandoned. Trotsky argued that Petrograd needed to be defended, at least in part to prevent Estonia and Finland from intervening. In a rare reversal, Trotsky was supported by Stalin and Zinoviev, and prevailed against Lenin in the Central Committee.

1920 

With the defeat of Denikin and Yudenich in late 1919, the Soviet government's emphasis shifted to the economy. Trotsky spent the winter of 1919–20 in the Urals region trying to restart its economy. A false rumor of his assassination circulated in Germany and the international press on New Year's Day 1920. Based on his experiences, he proposed abandoning the policies of War Communism, which included confiscating grain from peasants, and partially restoring the grain market. Still committed to War Communism, Lenin rejected his proposal.

In early 1920, Soviet–Polish tensions eventually led to the Polish–Soviet War. In the run-up and during the war, Trotsky argued that the Red Army was exhausted and the Soviet government should sign a peace treaty with Poland as soon as possible. He did not believe that the Red Army would find much support in Poland proper. Lenin later wrote that he and other Bolshevik leaders believed the Red Army's successes in the Russian Civil War and against the Poles meant "The defensive period of the war with worldwide imperialism was over, and we could, and had the obligation to, exploit the military situation to launch an offensive war."

Poland defeated the Red Army, and the offensive was turned back during the Battle of Warsaw in August 1920. Back in Moscow, Trotsky again argued for a peace treaty, and this time prevailed.

Trade union debate (1920–1921) 
Trotsky's position formed while he led a special commission on the Soviet transportation system, Tsektran. He was appointed there to rebuild the rail system ruined by the Civil War. Being the Commissar of War and a revolutionary military leader, he saw a need to create a militarized "production atmosphere" by incorporating trade unions directly into the State apparatus. His unyielding stance was that in a worker's state, the workers should have nothing to fear from the State, and the State should fully control the unions. In the Ninth Party Congress, he argued for: "....a regime in which every worker feels himself a soldier of labour, who cannot dispose of himself freely; if the order is given to transfer him, he must carry it out; if he does not carry it out, he will be a deserter who is punished. Who looks after this? The trade unions. It creates the new regime. This is the militarisation of the working class."

Lenin sharply criticized Trotsky and accused him of "bureaucratically nagging the trade unions" and of staging "factional attacks." His view did not focus on State control as much as the concern that a new relationship was needed between the State and the rank-and-file workers. He said, "Introduction of genuine labour discipline is conceived only if the whole mass of participants in productions takes a conscious part in the fulfillment of these tasks. Bureaucratic methods and orders from above cannot achieve this." This was a debate that Lenin thought the party could not afford. His frustration with Trotsky was used by Stalin and Zinoviev with their support for Lenin's position, to improve their standing within the Bolshevik leadership at Trotsky's expense.

Disagreements threatened to get out of hand, and many Bolsheviks, including Lenin, feared that the party would splinter. The Central Committee was split almost evenly between Lenin's and Trotsky's supporters, with all three Secretaries of the Central Committee (Krestinsky, Yevgeny Preobrazhensky and Leonid Serebryakov) supporting Trotsky.

At a meeting of his faction at the Tenth Party Congress in March 1921, Lenin's faction won a decisive victory, and a number of Trotsky's supporters (including all three secretaries of the Central Committee) lost their leadership positions. Krestinsky was replaced as a member of the Politburo by Zinoviev, who had supported Lenin. Krestinsky's place in the secretariat was taken by Vyacheslav Molotov. The congress also adopted a secret resolution on "Party unity", which banned factions within the Party except during pre-Congress discussions. The resolution was later published and used by Stalin against Trotsky and other opponents.

Disappointed in the direction of the Bolshevik government, the rebels from Kronstadt—whom Leon Trotsky himself had praised earlier as "adornment and pride of the revolution"—demanded a series of reforms: reduction in Bolshevik power, newly elected soviet councils to include socialist and anarchist groups, economic freedom for peasants and workers, dissolution of the bureaucratic governmental organs created during the civil war, and the restoration of civil rights for the working class.

Convinced of the popularity of the reforms they were fighting for (which they partially tried to implement during the revolt), the Kronstadt seamen waited in vain for the support of the population in the rest of the country and rejected aid from emigrants. Although the council of officers advocated a more offensive strategy, the rebels maintained a passive attitude as they waited for the government to take the first step in negotiations. By contrast, the authorities took an uncompromising stance, presenting an ultimatum demanding unconditional surrender on March 5. Once this period expired, the Bolsheviks raided the island several times and suppressed the revolt on March 18 after killing several thousand people.

At the end of the Tenth Congress, Trotsky himself gave the order for the suppression of the Kronstadt rebellion, which was the last major revolt against Bolshevik rule. Trotsky presented alleged French press articles announcing the revolt two weeks before its outbreak as proof that the rebellion was a plan devised by the emigre and the forces of the Entente. Lenin used the same tactic to accuse the rebels a few days later at the 10th Party Congress. Trotsky's role was questioned by other socialists, including ex-Trotskyists. In the United States, Dwight Macdonald broke with Trotsky and left the Trotskyist Socialist Workers Party by noting the Kronstadt rebellion. A similar critique of Trotsky's role in the Kronstadt rebellion was raised by American anarchist Emma Goldman. In her essay "Trotsky Protests Too Much", she states, "I admit, the dictatorship under Stalin's rule has become monstrous. That does not, however, lessen the guilt of Leon Trotsky as one of the actors in the revolutionary drama of which Kronstadt was one of the bloodiest scenes". Some Trotskyists, most notably Abbie Bakan, have argued that the claim that the Kronstadt rebels were "counterrevolutionary" has been supported by evidence of White Army and French government support for the Kronstadt sailors' March rebellion. Other historians, most notably Paul Avrich, claimed the evidence did not point towards this conclusion, and saw the Kronstadt Rebellion as spontaneous.

Trotsky's contribution to the Russian Revolution 

Vladimir Cherniaev, a leading Russian historian, sums up Trotsky's main contributions to the Russian Revolution:

Historian Geoffrey Swain argues that:

Lenin said in 1921 that Trotsky was "in love with organisation," but in working politics, "he has not got a clue." Swain explains the paradox by arguing that Trotsky was not good at teamwork; he was a loner who had mostly worked as a journalist, not as a professional revolutionary like the others.

Lenin's illness (1922–1923) 

In late 1921, Lenin's health deteriorated and he was absent from Moscow for longer periods of time. He had three strokes between 25 May 1922 and 9 March 1923, which caused paralysis, loss of speech and finally death on 21 January 1924. With Lenin increasingly sidelined throughout 1922, Stalin was elevated to the newly created position of the Central Committee general secretary. Zinoviev and Lev Kamenev became part of the troika (triumvirate) formed by Stalin to ensure that Trotsky, publicly the number-two man in the country and Lenin's heir presumptive, would not succeed Lenin.

The rest of the recently expanded Politburo (Rykov, Mikhail Tomsky, Bukharin) was at first uncommitted, but eventually joined the troika. Stalin's power of patronage in his capacity as general secretary clearly played a role, but Trotsky and his supporters later concluded that a more fundamental reason was the process of slow bureaucratisation of the Soviet regime once the extreme conditions of the Civil War were over. Much of the Bolshevik elite wanted 'normality,' while Trotsky was personally and politically personified as representing a turbulent revolutionary period that they would much rather leave behind.

Although the exact sequence of events is unclear, evidence suggests that at first the troika nominated Trotsky to head second-rate government departments (e.g., Gokhran, the State Depository for Valuables). In mid-July 1922, Kamenev wrote a letter to the recovering Lenin to the effect that "(the Central Committee) is throwing or is ready to throw a good cannon overboard". Lenin was shocked and responded:

From then until his final stroke, Lenin spent much of his time trying to devise a way to prevent a split within the Communist Party leadership, which was reflected in Lenin's Testament. As part of this effort, on 11 September 1922 Lenin proposed that Trotsky become his deputy at the Council of People's Commissars (Sovnarkom). The Politburo approved the proposal, but Trotsky "categorically refused". Lenin's proposal has been interpreted by various scholars as evidence that he designated Trotsky as a successor as head of government.

In late 1922, Trotsky secured an alliance with Lenin against Stalin and the emerging Soviet bureaucracy. Stalin had recently engineered the creation of the Union of Soviet Socialist Republics (USSR), further centralising state control. The alliance proved effective on the issue of foreign trade but was hindered by Lenin's progressing illness.

In January 1923, Lenin amended his Testament to suggest that Stalin should be removed as the party's general secretary, while also mildly criticising Trotsky and other Bolshevik leaders. The relationship between Stalin and Lenin had broken down completely by this time, as was demonstrated during an event where Stalin crudely insulted Lenin's wife, Nadezhda Krupskaya. In March 1923, days before his third stroke, Lenin asked Trotsky to denounce Stalin and his so-called "Great-Russian nationalistic campaign" at the XIIth Party Congress.

At the XIIth Party Congress in April 1923, however, just after Lenin's final stroke, Trotsky did not raise the issue. Instead, he made a speech about intra-party democracy while avoiding any direct confrontation of the troika. Stalin had prepared for the congress by replacing many local party delegates with those loyal to him, mostly at the expense of Zinoviev and Kamenev's backers.

The delegates, most of whom were unaware of the divisions within the Politburo, gave Trotsky a standing ovation. This upset the troika, already infuriated by Karl Radek's article, "Leon Trotsky – Organiser of Victory" published in Pravda on 14 March 1923. Stalin delivered the key reports on organisational structure and questions of nationality; while Zinoviev delivered the Central Committee political report, traditionally Lenin's prerogative. Among the resolutions adopted by the XIIth Congress were those calling for greater democracy within the Party, but these were vague and remained unimplemented.

Left opposition (1923–1924) 

Starting in mid-1923, the Soviet economy ran into significant difficulties, which led to numerous strikes countrywide. Two secret groups within the Communist Party, "Workers' Truth" and "Workers' Group", were uncovered and suppressed by the Soviet secret police. On 8 October 1923 Trotsky sent a letter to the Central Committee and the Central Control Commission, attributing these difficulties to lack of intra-Party democracy. Trotsky wrote:

Other senior communists who had similar concerns sent The Declaration of 46 to the Central Committee on 15 October, in which they wrote:

Although the text of these letters remained secret at the time, they had a significant effect on the Party leadership and prompted a partial retreat by the troika and its supporters on the issue of intra-Party democracy, notably in Zinoviev's Pravda article published on 7 November. Throughout November, the troika tried to come up with a compromise to placate, or at least temporarily neutralise, Trotsky and his supporters. (Their task was made easier by the fact that Trotsky was sick in November and December.) The first draft of the resolution was rejected by Trotsky, which led to the formation of a special group consisting of Stalin, Trotsky and Kamenev, which was charged with drafting a mutually acceptable compromise. On 5 December, the Politburo and the Central Control Commission unanimously adopted the group's final draft as its resolution. On 8 December, Trotsky published an open letter, in which he expounded on the recently adopted resolution's ideas. The troika used his letter as an excuse to launch a campaign against Trotsky, accusing him of factionalism, setting "the youth against the fundamental generation of old revolutionary Bolsheviks" and other sins.

Trotsky defended his position in a series of seven letters which were collected as The New Course in January 1924. The illusion of a "monolithic Bolshevik leadership" was thus shattered and a lively intra-Party discussion ensued, both in local Party organizations and in the pages of Pravda. The discussion lasted most of December and January until the XIIIth Party Conference of 16–18 January 1924. Those who opposed the Central Committee's position in the debate were thereafter referred to as members of the Left Opposition. In 1924, in a series of conferences at Sverdlov University; Stalin cited several times, in a critical way 'the Permanentists', as the followers of Trotsky 'Permanent revolution'.

Since the troika controlled the Party apparatus through Stalin's Secretariat and Pravda through its editor Bukharin, it was able to direct the discussion and the process of delegate selection. Although Trotsky's position prevailed within the Red Army and Moscow universities and received about half the votes in the Moscow Party organisation, it was defeated elsewhere, and the Conference was packed with pro-troika delegates. In the end, only three delegates voted for Trotsky's position, and the Conference denounced "Trotskyism" as a "petty bourgeois deviation".

After Lenin's death (1924) 
There was little overt political disagreement within the Soviet leadership throughout most of 1924. On the surface, Trotsky remained the most prominent and popular Bolshevik leader, although his "mistakes" were often alluded to by troika partisans. Behind the scenes, he was completely cut off from the decision-making process. Politburo meetings were pure formalities since all key decisions were made ahead of time by the troika and its supporters. Trotsky's control over the military was undermined by reassigning his deputy, Ephraim Sklyansky, and appointing Mikhail Frunze, who was being groomed to take Trotsky's place.

At the thirteenth Party Congress in May, Trotsky delivered a conciliatory speech:

In the meantime, the Left Opposition, which had coagulated somewhat unexpectedly in late 1923 and lacked a definite platform aside from general dissatisfaction with the intra-Party "regime", began to crystallise. It lost some less dedicated members to the harassment by the troika, but it also began formulating a program.

Economically, the Left Opposition and its theoretician Yevgeni Preobrazhensky came out against further development of capitalist elements in the Soviet economy and in favour of faster industrialisation. That put them at odds with Bukharin and Rykov, the "Right" group within the Party, who supported the troika at the time. On the question of world revolution, Trotsky and Karl Radek saw a period of stability in Europe while Stalin and Zinoviev confidently predicted an "acceleration" of revolution in Western Europe in 1924. On the theoretical plane, Trotsky remained committed to the Bolshevik idea that the Soviet Union could not create a true socialist society in the absence of the world revolution, while Stalin gradually came up with a policy of building 'Socialism in One Country'. These ideological divisions provided much of the intellectual basis for the political divide between Trotsky and the Left Opposition on the one hand and Stalin and his allies on the other.

At the thirteenth Congress Kamenev and Zinoviev helped Stalin defuse Lenin's Testament, which belatedly came to the surface. But just after the congress, the troika, always an alliance of convenience, showed signs of weakness. Stalin began making poorly veiled accusations about Zinoviev and Kamenev. Yet in October 1924, Trotsky published Lessons of October, an extensive summary of the events of the 1917 revolution.

In it, he described Zinoviev's and Kamenev's opposition to the Bolshevik seizure of power in 1917, something that the two would have preferred be left unmentioned. This started a new round of intra-party struggle, which became known as the Literary Discussion, with Zinoviev and Kamenev again allied with Stalin against Trotsky. Their criticism of Trotsky was concentrated in three areas:
 Trotsky's disagreements and conflicts with Lenin and the Bolsheviks prior to 1917.
 Trotsky's alleged distortion of the events of 1917 in order to emphasise his role and diminish the roles played by other Bolsheviks.
 Trotsky's harsh treatment of his subordinates and other alleged mistakes during the Russian Civil War.

Trotsky was again sick and unable to respond while his opponents mobilised all of their resources to denounce him. They succeeded in damaging his military reputation so much that he was forced to resign as People's Commissar of Army and Fleet Affairs and Chairman of the Revolutionary Military Council on 6 January 1925. Zinoviev demanded Trotsky's expulsion from the Communist Party, but Stalin refused to go along and played the role of a moderate. Trotsky kept his Politburo seat, but was effectively put on probation.

A year in the wilderness (1925) 

For Trotsky, 1925 was a difficult year. After the bruising Literary Discussion and losing his Red Army posts, he was effectively unemployed throughout the winter and spring. In May 1925, he was given three posts: chairman of the Concessions Committee, head of the electro-technical board, and chairman of the scientific-technical board of industry. Trotsky wrote in My Life that he "was taking a rest from politics" and "naturally plunged into the new line of work up to my ears".

Some contemporary accounts paint a picture of a remote and distracted man. Later in the year, Trotsky resigned his two technical positions (maintaining Stalin-instigated interference and sabotage) and concentrated on his work in the Concessions Committee.

In one of the few political developments that affected Trotsky in 1925, the circumstances of the controversy over Lenin's Testament were described by American Marxist Max Eastman in his book Since Lenin Died (1925). Trotsky denied these statements made by Eastman in an article he wrote.

In the meantime, the troika finally broke up. Bukharin and Rykov sided with Stalin while Krupskaya and Soviet Commissar of Finance Grigory Sokolnikov aligned with Zinoviev and Kamenev. The struggle became open at the September 1925 meeting of the Central Committee and came to a head at the XIV Party Congress in December 1925. With only the Leningrad Party organization behind them, Zinoviev and Kamenev, dubbed The New Opposition, were thoroughly defeated, while Trotsky refused to get involved in the fight and did not speak at the Congress.

United Opposition (1926–1927) 
In early 1926, Zinoviev, Kamenev and their supporters in the "New Opposition" gravitated closer to Trotsky's supporters, and the two groups soon formed an alliance, which also incorporated some smaller opposition groups within the Communist Party. The alliance became known as the United Opposition.

The United Opposition was repeatedly threatened with sanctions by the Stalinist leadership of the Communist Party, and Trotsky had to agree to tactical retreats, mostly to preserve his alliance with Zinoviev and Kamenev. The opposition remained united against Stalin throughout 1926 and 1927, especially on the issue of the Chinese Revolution. The methods used by the Stalinists against the Opposition became more and more extreme. At the XV Party Conference in October 1926, Trotsky could barely speak because of interruptions and catcalls, and at the end of the Conference he lost his Politburo seat. In 1927, Stalin started using the GPU (Soviet secret police) to infiltrate and discredit the opposition. Rank-and-file oppositionists were increasingly harassed, sometimes expelled from the Party and even arrested.

Soviet policy toward the Chinese Revolution became the ideological line of demarcation between Stalin and the United Opposition. The Chinese Revolution began on 10 October 1911, resulting in the abdication of the Chinese Emperor, Puyi, on 12 February 1912. Sun Yat-sen established the Republic of China.
In reality, however, the Republic controlled very little of the country. Much of China was divided between various regional warlords. The Republican government established a new "nationalist people's army and a national people's party"—the Kuomintang. In 1920, the Kuomintang opened relations with Soviet Russia. With Soviet help, the Republic of China built up the nationalist people's army. With the development of the nationalist army, a Northern Expedition was planned to smash the power of the warlords of the northern part of the country. This Northern Expedition became a point of contention over foreign policy by Stalin and Trotsky. Stalin tried to persuade the small Chinese Communist Party to merge with the Kuomintang (KMT) Nationalists to bring about a bourgeois revolution before attempting to bring about a Soviet-style working class revolution.

Trotsky wanted the Communist Party to complete an orthodox proletarian revolution and have clear class independence from the KMT. Stalin funded the KMT during the expedition. Stalin countered Trotskyist criticism by making a secret speech in which he said that Chiang Kai-shek's right-wing Kuomintang were the only ones capable of defeating the imperialists, that Chiang had funding from the rich merchants, and that his forces were to be utilized until squeezed for all usefulness like a lemon before being discarded. However, Chiang quickly reversed the tables in the Shanghai massacre of 12 April 1927 by massacring the Communist Party in Shanghai midway through the Northern Expedition.

Defeat and exile (1927–1928) 

Trotsky gave the eulogy at the funeral of his friend, the Soviet diplomat Adolph Joffe, in November 1927. It would be the last speech that Trotsky would give in the Soviet Union. When the XV Party Congress made United Opposition views incompatible with membership in the Communist Party, Zinoviev, Kamenev and their supporters capitulated and renounced their alliance with the Left Opposition. Trotsky and most of his followers, on the other hand, refused to surrender and stayed the course. Trotsky was exiled to Alma Ata, Kazakhstan on 31 January 1928. He was expelled from the Soviet Union to Turkey in February 1929, accompanied by his wife Natalia Sedova and their eldest son, Lev.

Fate of Left Oppositionists after Trotsky's exile (1929–1941) 

After Trotsky's expulsion from the Soviet Union, Trotskyists within the Soviet Union began to waver. Between 1929 and 1932, most leading members of the Left Opposition surrendered to Stalin, "admitted their mistakes" and were reinstated in the Communist Party. One initial exception to this was Christian Rakovsky, who inspired Trotsky between 1929 and 1934 with his refusal to capitulate as state suppression of any remaining opposition to Stalin increased by the year. In late 1932, Rakovsky had failed with an attempt to flee the Soviet Union and was exiled to Yakutia in March 1933. Answering Trotsky's request, the French mathematician and Trotskyist Jean Van Heijenoort, together with his fellow activist Pierre Frank, unsuccessfully called on the influential Soviet author Maxim Gorky to intervene in favor of Christian Rakovsky, and boarded the ship he was traveling on near Constantinople. According to Heijenoort, they only managed to meet Gorky's son, Maxim Peshkov, who reportedly told them that his father was indisposed, but promised to pass on their request. Rakovsky was the last prominent Trotskyist to capitulate to Stalin in April 1934, when Rakovsky formally "admitted his mistakes" (his letter to Pravda, titled There Should Be No Mercy, depicted Trotsky and his supporters as "agents of the German Gestapo"). Rakovsky was appointed to high office in the Commissariat for Health and allowed to return to Moscow, also serving as Soviet ambassador to Japan in 1935. However, Rakovsky was cited in allegations involving the killing of Sergey Kirov, and was arrested and imprisoned in late 1937, during the Great Purge.

Almost all Trotskyists who were still within the Soviet Union's borders were executed in the Great Purges of 1936–1938, although Rakovsky survived until the Medvedev Forest massacre of September 1941, where he was shot dead along with 156 other prisoners on Stalin's orders, less than three months into the Axis invasion of the Soviet Union. Also among the Medvedev Forest victims was Trotsky's sister/Kamenev's first wife, Olga Kameneva.

Exile (1929–1940)

Turkey
After being deported from the Soviet Union, in February 1929, Trotsky arrived in Turkey. During his first two months in Turkey, Trotsky lived with his wife and eldest son at the Soviet Union Consulate in Istanbul and then at a nearby hotel in the city. In April 1929, Trotsky, his wife and son were moved to the island of Büyükada by the Turkish authorities. On Büyükada, they were moved into a house called the Yanaros mansion. During his exile in Turkey, Trotsky was under the surveillance of the Turkish police forces of Mustafa Kemal Pasha. Trotsky was also at risk from the many former White Army officers who lived on Prinkipo, officers who had opposed the October Revolution and who had been defeated by Trotsky and the Red Army in the Russian Civil War. However, Trotsky's European supporters volunteered to serve as bodyguards and assured his safety. At this time, he made requests to enter Belgium, France, Norway, Germany, and the United Kingdom, but all refused access.

In 1931, Trotsky wrote a letter to a friend entitled "What is Fascism" in which he attempted to define fascism and asserted that the Comintern was wrong to describe the Dictatorship of Primo de Rivera as "fascist" because it was not a mass movement arising from a base in the lower classes.

On 20 February 1932, Trotsky and all of his family lost their Soviet citizenship and were forbidden to enter the Soviet Union. In 1932, Trotsky entered via a port into the fascist Kingdom of Italy on his way to a socialist conference in Denmark. By the end of 1932, Trotsky had joined a conspiratorial political bloc with the anti-Stalin opposition inside the USSR. There was no evidence of any alliance with Nazi Germany or Japan, as the Soviet Union government claimed. The alleged members of the anti-Stalin bloc were Zinovievites, rightists and Trotskyists who "capitulated" to Stalin. Kamenev and Zinoviev were also alleged members of the bloc. Trotsky wanted by no means that the alliance became a fusion, and he was afraid of the right gaining much power inside the bloc. Historian Pierre Broué concluded that the bloc dissolved in early 1933, since some of its members like Zinoviev and Kamenev joined Stalin again, and because there were no letters in the Trotsky Harvard archive mentioning the bloc after 1932.

France
In July 1933, Trotsky was offered asylum in France by Prime Minister Édouard Daladier. Trotsky accepted the offer, but he was forbidden to live in Paris and soon found himself under the surveillance of the French police. From July 1933 to February 1934, Trotsky and his wife lived in Royan. The philosopher and activist Simone Weil also arranged for Trotsky and his bodyguards to stay for a few days at her parents' house. Following the 6 February 1934 crisis in France, the French minister of internal affairs, Albert Sarraut, signed a decree to deport Trotsky from France. However, no foreign government was found willing to accept Trotsky within its borders. Accordingly, the French authorities instructed Trotsky to move to a residence in the tiny village of Barbizon under the strict surveillance of the French police, where Trotsky found his contact with the outside world to be even worse than during his exile in Turkey.

In May 1935, soon after the French government had agreed to the Franco-Soviet Treaty of Mutual Assistance with the Soviet Union government, Trotsky was officially told that he was no longer welcome in France. After weighing his options, Trotsky applied to move to Norway.

Norway
After obtaining permission from Justice Minister Trygve Lie to enter the country, Trotsky and his wife became a guest of Konrad Knudsen at Norderhov, near Hønefoss, and spent over a year living at Knudsen's house, from 18 June 1935 to 2 September 1936. Trotsky was hospitalized for a few weeks at the nearby Oslo Community Hospital, from 19 September 1935. 

Following French media complaints about Trotsky's role in encouraging the mass strikes in France in May and June 1936 with his articles, the Johan Nygaardsvold-led Norwegian government began to exhibit disquiet about Trotsky's actions. In the summer of 1936, Trotsky's asylum was increasingly made a political issue by the fascist Nasjonal Samling, led by Vidkun Quisling, along with an increase in pressure from the Soviet government on the Norwegian authorities. On 5 August 1936, Knudsen's house was burgled by fascists from the Nasjonal Samling while Trotsky and his wife were out on a seashore trip with Knudsen and his wife. The burglars targeted Trotsky's works and archives for vandalism. The raid was largely thwarted by Knudsen's daughter, Hjørdis, although the burglars did take a few papers from the nearest table as they left. Although the perpetrators were caught and put on trial, the "evidence" obtained in the burglary was used by the government to make claims against Trotsky. 

On 14 August 1936, the Soviet Press Agency TASS announced the discovery of a "Trotskyist–Zinovievist" plot and the imminent start of the Moscow Trials of the accused. Trotsky demanded a complete and open enquiry into Moscow's accusations. The accused were sentenced to death, including Grigory Zinoviev and Lev Kamenev, and executed on 25 August 1936. On 26 August 1936, eight policemen arrived at Knudsen's house demanding that Trotsky sign new conditions for residing in Norway. These conditions included agreeing to write no more about current political matters, to give no interviews, and to have all his correspondence (incoming and outgoing) inspected by the police. Trotsky categorically refused the conditions, and Trotsky was then told that he and his wife would soon be moved to another residence. The following day Trotsky was interrogated by the police about his political activities, with the police officially citing Trotsky as a "witness" to the fascist raid of 5 August 1936.

On 2 September 1936, four weeks after the break-in at Knudsen's house, Trygve Lie ordered that Trotsky and his wife be transferred to a farm in Hurum, where they were under house arrest. The treatment of Trotsky and his wife at Hurum was harsh, as they were forced to stay indoors for 22 hours per day under the constant guard of thirteen policemen, with only one hour permitted twice a day for a walk on the farm. Trotsky was prevented from posting any letters and prevented from arguing back against his critics in Norway and beyond. Only Trotsky's lawyers and the Norwegian Labour Party Parliamentary leader, Olav Scheflo, were permitted to visit. From October 1936, even the outdoor walks were prohibited for Trotsky and his wife. Trotsky did eventually manage to smuggle out one letter on 18 December 1936, titled The Moscow "Confessions". On 19 December 1936, Trotsky and his wife were deported from Norway after being put on the Norwegian oil tanker Ruth, under guard by Jonas Lie. When later living in Mexico, Trotsky was utterly scathing about the treatment he received during his 108 days at Hurum, and accused the Norwegian government of trying to prevent him from publicly voicing his strong opposition to the Moscow Trials and other show trials, saying:

Mexico

The Ruth arrived in Mexico on 9 January 1937. On Trotsky's arrival, the Mexican president, Lázaro Cárdenas, welcomed Trotsky to Mexico and arranged for his special train The Hidalgo to bring Trotsky to Mexico City from the port of Tampico.

From January 1937 to April 1939, Trotsky and his wife lived in the Coyoacán area of Mexico City at La Casa Azul (The Blue House), the home of the painter Diego Rivera and Rivera's wife and fellow painter, Frida Kahlo, with whom Trotsky had an affair. His final move was a few blocks away to a residence on Avenida Viena in April 1939, following a break with Rivera.

Trotsky wrote prolifically while in exile, penning several key works, including his History of the Russian Revolution (1930) and The Revolution Betrayed (1936), a critique of the Soviet Union under Stalinism. He argued that the Soviet state had become a "degenerated workers' state" controlled by an undemocratic bureaucracy, which would eventually either be overthrown via a political revolution establishing a workers' democracy, or degenerate into a capitalist class.

While in Mexico, Trotsky also worked closely with James P. Cannon, Joseph Hansen, and Farrell Dobbs of the Socialist Workers Party of the United States, and other supporters. Cannon, a long-time leading member of the American communist movement, had supported Trotsky in the struggle against Stalinism since he had first read Trotsky's criticisms of the Soviet Union in 1928. Trotsky's critique of the Stalinist regime, though banned, was distributed to leaders of the Comintern. Among his other supporters was Chen Duxiu, founder of the Chinese Communist Party.

While in Mexico, Trotsky worked with André Breton and Diego Rivera to write the Manifesto for an Independent Revolutionary Art, which inspired the creation of the organization, the International Federation of Independent Revolutionary Art (FIARI) in 1938. This organization was short-lived and ended before 1940.

Moscow show trials 
In August 1936, the first Moscow show trial of the so-called "Trotskyite–Zinovievite Terrorist Center" was staged in front of an international audience. During the trial, Zinoviev, Kamenev and 14 other accused, most of them prominent Old Bolsheviks, confessed to having plotted with Trotsky to kill Stalin and other members of the Soviet leadership. The court found every defendant guilty, sentencing them to death, Trotsky, in absentia. The second show trial of Karl Radek, Grigori Sokolnikov, Yuri Pyatakov and 14 others, took place in January 1937, during which more alleged conspiracies and crimes were linked to Trotsky. The findings were published in the book "Not Guilty".

Fourth International 

For fear of splitting the Communist movement, Trotsky initially opposed the idea of establishing parallel Communist parties or a parallel international Communist organization that would compete with the Third International. In mid-1933, after the Nazi takeover in Germany and the Comintern's response to it, he changed his mind. He said:

In 1938, Trotsky and his supporters founded the Fourth International, which was intended to be a revolutionary and internationalist alternative to the Stalinist Comintern.

The Dies Committee 

Towards the end of 1939, Trotsky agreed to go to the United States to appear as a witness before the Dies Committee of the House of Representatives, a forerunner of the House Committee on Un-American Activities. Representative Martin Dies Jr., chairman of the committee, demanded the suppression of the American Communist Party. Trotsky intended to use the forum to expose the NKVD's activities against him and his followers.

He made it clear that he also intended to argue against the suppression of the American Communist Party and to use the committee as a platform for a call to transform World War II into a world revolution. Many of his supporters argued against his appearance. When the committee learned the nature of the testimony Trotsky intended to present, it refused to hear him, and he was denied a visa to enter the United States. On hearing about it, the Communist Party of the Soviet Union immediately accused Trotsky of being in the pay of the oil magnates and the Federal Bureau of Investigation.

Final months 
After quarreling with Diego Rivera, Trotsky moved to his final residence on Avenida Viena in April 1939. On 27 February 1940, Trotsky wrote a document known as "Trotsky's Testament", in which he expressed his final thoughts and feelings for posterity. He was suffering from high blood pressure, and feared that he would suffer a cerebral haemorrhage. After forcefully denying Stalin's accusations that he had betrayed the working class, he thanked his friends and above all his wife, Natalia Sedova, for their loyal support:

Assassination 

After a failed attempt to have Trotsky murdered in March 1939, Stalin assigned the overall organization of implementing the task to the NKVD officer Pavel Sudoplatov, who, in turn, co-opted Nahum Eitingon. According to Sudoplatov's Special Tasks, the NKVD proceeded to set up three NKVD agent networks to carry out the murder; these three networks were designed to operate entirely autonomously from the NKVD's hitherto-established spy networks in the U.S. and Mexico.

On 24 May 1940, Trotsky survived a raid on his villa by armed assassins led by the NKVD agent Iosif Grigulevich and Mexican painter David Alfaro Siqueiros. Trotsky's 14-year-old grandson, Vsevolod Platonovich "Esteban" Volkov (born 7 March 1926), was shot in the foot. A young assistant and bodyguard of Trotsky, Robert Sheldon Harte, disappeared with the attackers and was later found murdered; it is probable that he was an accomplice who granted them access to the villa. Trotsky's other guards fended off the attackers. Following the failed assassination attempt, Trotsky wrote an article titled "Stalin Seeks My Death" on 8 June 1940, in which he stated that another assassination attempt was certain.

On 20 August 1940, Trotsky was attacked in his study by Spanish-born NKVD agent Ramón Mercader, who used an ice axe as a weapon.

A mountaineering ice axe has a narrow end, called the pick, and a flat wide end called the adze. The adze of the axe wounded Trotsky, fracturing his parietal bone and penetrating  into his brain. The blow to his head was bungled and failed to kill Trotsky instantly. Witnesses stated that Trotsky spat on Mercader and began struggling fiercely with him, which resulted in Mercader's hand being broken. Hearing the commotion, Trotsky's bodyguards burst into the room and nearly beat Mercader to death, but Trotsky stopped them, laboriously stating that the assassin should be made to answer questions. Trotsky was then taken to a hospital and operated on, surviving for more than a day, but dying, at the age of 60, on 21 August 1940 from exsanguination and shock. Mercader later testified at his trial:

According to James P. Cannon, the Trotskyist secretary of the American Socialist Workers Party, Trotsky's last words were "I will not survive this attack. Stalin has finally accomplished the task he attempted unsuccessfully before." Mercader was tried and convicted of the murder and spent the next 20 years in a Mexican prison. Stalin wrote that the assassin of Trotsky was a dangerous Trotskyist. This is why Mercader had no awards initially, though his mother was presented with the Order of Lenin for her own part of the operation. Ramón Mercader could not be either assassinated or freed from prison by the Soviets. When he was released from jail in 1960 and arrived to the USSR in 1961, Leonid Brezhnev signed a sentence to award Mercader the Order of Lenin, the Gold Star, and the title of the Hero of the Soviet Union "for the special deed". The KGB boss Alexander Shelepin presented all these awards to Ramón Mercader in person.

In the aftermath of Trotsky's assassination, an estimated 300,000 people had passed by his casket in Mexico City over several days by 27 August 1940.

Personality and characteristics 

Trotsky was regarded as an outstanding orator, preeminent theoretician and organiser that “forged and directed the Red Army”.

Ernest Mandel summarised the dominant image of Trotsky as “self-confident”, “unshakeable in the conviction of his historic mission”, “strict with others and himself” and “indifferent to material privileges and to the small joys and sorrows of life”. Mandel argued this image reflected “certain aspects of Trotsky’s personality, strengths and weaknesses”.

Simon Sebag Montefiore described Trotsky as the “genius of the revolution” and Dmitri Volkogonov characterised him as a “vivid, complex, multi-faceted personality in the gallery of world figures” who was remembered “with hatred and respect, anger and admiration” decades after his assassination in Mexico.

Robert Service commented that he was a “volatile and untrustworthy”, “arrogant individual” that impressed supporters even during the periods of “personal adversity in the 1920s and 1930s” but failed to “coax and encourage them to the full”. Service stated that Trotsky gave the “minimum time of his time to the Jewish question” and believed that “he ceased to be a Jew in any important sense because Marxism had burned out the fortuitous residues of his origins”.

Trotsky had a diverse and profound range of interests which exceeded that of other Bolshevik theoreticians such as Nikolai Bukharin. He had a notable interest in literature and wrote on “everyday life and cultural progress as well as on the more customary Marxism of the day”.

Trotsky spoke several European languages “with a markedly Russian accent” and identified as a cosmopolitan and internationalist. In the course of his life, Trotsky wrote about 30,000 documents in which the majority are contained in various archives.

Legacy 

Trotsky's house in Coyoacán has been preserved in much the same condition as it was on the day he was assassinated there, and is now the Leon Trotsky House Museum in Mexico City, run by a board which includes his grandson Esteban Volkov. Trotsky's grave is located on its grounds. The foundation "International Friends of the Leon Trotsky Museum" has been organized to raise funds to improve the museum further.

Shortly before his assassination, Trotsky agreed to sell the bulk of the papers he still had to Harvard University. After his assassination, his widow, Natalya Sedova collected his remaining papers and shipped them to Harvard, and in the years following, Harvard managed to collect additional papers that had been hidden from both Soviet and Nazi agents in Europe.  These papers now occupy  of shelf space in Harvard's Houghton Library.

Trotsky was never formally rehabilitated during the rule of the Soviet government, despite the de-Stalinization-era rehabilitation of most other Old Bolsheviks killed during the Great Purges. His son, Sergei Sedov, who died in 1937, was rehabilitated in 1988, as was Nikolai Bukharin. Beginning in 1989, Trotsky's books, forbidden until 1987, were published in the Soviet Union.

Trotsky was rehabilitated on 16 June 2001 by the General Prosecutor's Office (Certificates of Rehabilitation No. 13/2182-90, No. 13-2200-99 in Archives Research Center "Memorial").

Contributions to Marxist theory 

Trotsky considered himself to be a "Bolshevik-Leninist," arguing for the establishment of a vanguard party. He viewed himself as an advocate of orthodox Marxism.

His politics differed in some aspects from those of Stalin or Mao Zedong, most importantly in his rejection of the theory of Socialism in one country and his declaring of the need for an international "permanent revolution." Numerous Fourth Internationalist groups around the world continue to describe themselves as Trotskyists and see themselves as standing in this tradition. However, they have different interpretations of the conclusions to be drawn from this. Supporters of the Fourth International echo Trotsky's opposition to Stalinist totalitarianism, advocating political revolution and arguing that socialism cannot sustain itself without democracy. Trotsky also formulated a theory of fascism based on a dialectical interpretation of events  to analyse the manifestation of Italian fascism and the early emergence of Nazi Germany from 1930-33.

Permanent Revolution 

The Permanent Revolution concept is the theory that the bourgeois democratic tasks in countries with delayed bourgeois democratic development can only be accomplished through the establishment of a workers' state, and that the creation of a workers' state would inevitably involve inroads against capitalist property. Thus, the accomplishment of bourgeois democratic tasks passes over into proletarian tasks. Although most closely associated with Leon Trotsky, the call for a "Permanent Revolution" is first found in the writings of Karl Marx and Friedrich Engels in March 1850, in the aftermath of the 1848 Revolution, in their Address of the Central Committee to the Communist League:

Trotsky's conception of the Permanent Revolution is based on his understanding, drawing on the work of the founder of Russian Marxism Georgy Plekhanov, that in 'backward' countries the tasks of the Bourgeois Democratic Revolution could not be achieved by the bourgeoisie itself. Trotsky first developed this conception in collaboration with Alexander Parvus in late 1904–1905. The relevant articles were later collected in Trotsky's books 1905 and in "Permanent Revolution", which also contains his essay "Results and Prospects." Some Trotskyists have argued that the state of the Third World shows that capitalism offers no way forward for underdeveloped countries, thus again proving the central tenet of the theory.

United front 

Trotsky was a central figure in the Comintern during its first four congresses. During this time, he helped to generalize the strategy and tactics of the Bolsheviks to newly formed Communist parties across Europe and further afield. From 1921 onwards, the united front, a method of uniting revolutionaries and reformists in the common struggle while winning some of the workers to revolution, was the central tactic put forward by the Comintern after the defeat of the German revolution.

After he was exiled and politically marginalized by Stalinism, Trotsky continued to argue for a united front against fascism in Germany and Spain. According to Joseph Choonara of the British Socialist Workers Party in International Socialism, his articles on the united front represent an essential part of his political legacy.

In popular culture 
 In the grand strategy game called Hearts of Iron IV, Trotsky can become the leader of either the Soviet Union by rallying the Left Opposition and deposing Stalin though a civil war or a communist Mexico, by giving him a government role when he first seeks exile in the country.

 The comedic film, The Trotsky, centers around a protagonist named Leon Bronstein, played by Jay Baruchel, who believes himself to be the reincarnation of Leon Trotsky.

See also 
 Anti-Stalinist left
 Fourth International
 Foreign relations of the Soviet Union
 Group of Democratic Centralism
 Labor army
 Left Opposition
 Lenin's Testament
 Leon Trotsky bibliography
 List of Trotskyist internationals
 List of Trotskyist organizations by country
 Petrograd Soviet
 Primitive socialist accumulation
 Russian Revolution of 1905
 Scissors Crisis
 Uneven and combined development
 Variations on the Death of Trotsky, 1991 play
 Frida, 2002 film
 Trotsky, 2017 TV series

Notes

References

Bibliography

External links 

 
 Trotsky in Havana by Dimitri Prieto from Havana Times
 FBI records relating to Trotsky's murder
 The Contradiction of Trotsky by Claude Lefort
 Uncommon Knowledge. Interview with Christopher Hitchens and Robert Service about Leon Trotsky
 
 "How We Made the October Revolution" by Leon Trotsky. The New York Times, 1919.

Works 
 
 
 
 
 

 

1879 births
1940 deaths
1940 murders in Mexico
20th-century Russian writers
Anti-Stalinist left
Assassinated Russian politicians
Assassinated Soviet people
Comintern people
Russian Communist writers
Deaths by stabbing in Mexico
Expelled members of the Communist Party of the Soviet Union
Foreign ministers of Russia
Jewish anti-fascists
Jewish Mexican history
Jewish socialists
Jewish Soviet politicians
Male murder victims
Marxist theorists
Soviet Marxist writers
Mensheviks
Nonpersons in the Eastern Bloc
Odesa Jews
Old Bolsheviks
Orthodox Marxists
People excommunicated by synagogues
People denaturalized by the Soviet Union
People from Kirovohrad Oblast
People from Yelisavetgradsky Uyezd
People killed in NKVD operations
People murdered in Mexico
People of the 1905 Russian Revolution
People of the Polish–Soviet War
People of the Russian Civil War
People of the Russian Revolution
People's commissars and ministers of the Soviet Union
Politburo of the Central Committee of the Communist Party of the Soviet Union members
Refugees in Mexico
Russian anti–World War I activists
Russian communists
Russian exiles
Russian expatriates in Mexico
Russian expatriates in Norway
Russian Marxist writers
Russian revolutionaries
Russian Social Democratic Labour Party members
Soviet emigrants to France
Soviet emigrants to Mexico
Soviet expellees
Soviet Ministers of Defence
Soviet Trotskyists
Treaty of Brest-Litovsk negotiators
Ukrainian people murdered abroad
Russian people of Jewish descent
Russian Ashkenazi Jews
Prisoners of the Peter and Paul Fortress
Left Opposition